The 2007–08 Moldovan "B" Division was the 17th season of Moldovan football's third-tier league. There are 18 teams in the competition, in two groups, 9 in the North and 9 in the South.

"B" Division North

Final standings

"B" Division South

Final standings

External links 
 Official Site (North)
 Official Site (South)
 "B" Division - moldova.sports.md

Moldovan Liga 2 seasons
3
Moldova